Gaohu is a town in Qingtian County, in Zhejiang province, China. , it has 10 villages under its administration.

References

Towns of Zhejiang
Qingtian County